M. nana may refer to:
 Mazama nana, the pygmy brocket, a deer species from South America
 Microstrophia nana, a gastropod species endemic to Mauritius
 Monardella nana, the yellow monardella, a flowering plant species
 Myristica nana, a plant species endemic to Papua New Guinea

Synonyms
 Maxillaria nana, a synonym for Maxillaria uncata, the hook-shaped maxillaria, an orchid species found from southern Mexico to southern Brazil

See also
 Nana (disambiguation)